Lisa Bowman (born 2 November 1988) is a Northern Ireland netball international. She plays as a goal shooter. She plays for Team Northumbria in the Netball Superleague.

Career 
She received her maiden World Cup call during the 2011 World Netball Championships but she missed out due to maternity break. She was also a former Malcolm Brodie Player of the Year winner at the Belfast Telegraph Sports Awards.

She also represented Northern Ireland at the Commonwealth Games in 2014 and in 2018. She sustained a serious ankle injury during a training session two weeks prior to the start of the 2019 Netball World Cup and was ruled out of the tournament following medical testing. She was replaced by Noleen Lennon for the tournament.

References 

1988 births
Living people
Northern Ireland netball internationals
Netball players at the 2014 Commonwealth Games
Netball players at the 2018 Commonwealth Games
Commonwealth Games competitors for Northern Ireland
Team Northumbria netball players
Netball Superleague players
People from Magherafelt